Harry & Paul (originally titled Ruddy Hell! It's Harry & Paul) is a British sketch comedy show starring Harry Enfield and Paul Whitehouse. It was first broadcast on BBC One on 13 April 2007. Prior to broadcast it was trailed as The Harry Enfield Show.

The show reunites the pair, who had success with Harry Enfield's Television Programme in the 1990s.

The second series of the programme began on BBC One on 5 September 2008. This was the last TV series from the comedy producer Geoffrey Perkins, who died shortly before transmission. A third series was commissioned and began on 28 September 2010, this time on BBC Two, where the show had been moved to because of falling ratings. The fourth series was broadcast in 2012.

First series 

The first series' opening sequence is a parody of a skin care advertisement, and shows the two main female cast members (Morwenna Banks and Laura Solon) being given a pint of lager before the footage speeds rapidly as the women have make-up removed and hair cut, and are given cigarettes and hamburgers, followed by noodles and more cigarettes. As the make-up and hair are removed, it becomes clear the two women were Harry Enfield and Paul Whitehouse.

Second series 
In the opening sequence of the second series, Enfield and Whitehouse appear as two ageing Soviet-style dictators reviewing a parade. They wave grimly down at the procession, supposedly an example of an ancient and outdated means of politics, whilst a lyric concerning how they are "both incredibly handsome and tall" and "not even beginning to look old" is sung. The melody is based on the Russian national anthem. They also appear picking up three television awards – a National Television Award, a Bafta and a British Comedy Award. Visitors to the British Comedy Guide website voted it the Best British TV Sketch Show of 2008 in The Comedy.co.uk Awards.

According to Enfield and Whitehouse, the title sequence is a self-referential joke at the fact that the pair are "a pair of old-timers out of touch with the modern world", while, they claim, sketch comedy is a "young man's game".

The second series used fewer celebrity characters than the first.

Third series 
A third series was confirmed by Paul Whitehouse on the TV sketch show Horne & Corden. It had a new producer as the producer Geoffrey Perkins died in 2008, shortly before the second series was broadcast. Series 3 ran between 28 October and 2 December 2010, once again for 6 episodes. Unlike the first two series, it contained no audience laugh track.

Enfield and Whitehouse won a BAFTA for the second time in 2011, following the third series.

Fourth series 
Whilst appearing on The Alan Titchmarsh Show on 1 April 2011, Paul Whitehouse confirmed that the show had been recommissioned despite reports suggesting it had been cancelled earlier in the year. It began broadcasting on Sunday nights from 28 October 2012.

Specials

Story of the 2s 
Enfield and Whitehouse reunited for a one-hour special, which aired on 25 May 2014 as part of celebratory programmes marking the 50th anniversary of BBC Two entitled "Harry & Paul's Story of the 2s". The title is a parody of Simon Schama's 2013 BBC Two documentary The Story of the Jews.  It featured various parodies and sketches based on BBC Two programmes joined together in a mockumentary format looking at the history of the channel, including:
The Great War
Night News (Newsnight) and Naughty Nightie News (Late Night Line-Up)
The Forsyte Saga
The Likely Lads
Keep Still (Test Card F broadcast for 8 hours per day)
Pot Black with competitors attempting to pick up female members of the audience, drinking heavily, smoking and taking drugs.
The Pottering About of Man (The Ascent of Man)
Monty Python's Flying Circus
One Clavdivs (I, Claudius)
The Old Grey Wrinkly Testicle (The Old Grey Whistle Test)
Speech Impediment (Call My Bluff)
Men from the Mersey (a pro-Tory version of Boys from the Blackstuff)
40 Minutes
Not Monty Python's Nine O'Clock News (Not the Nine O'Clock News)
Blackadder with a fictional pilot episode based on the abdication of Edward VIII
Talking Heads of State (Talking Heads portraying leaders such as Josef Stalin)
Arena
Top Gear in its 2002 incarnation
Harry Emery & Chums (Harry Enfield & Chums)
Dennis from Heaven (Pennies from Heaven and The Singing Detective)
The Fast Show
Is Your Child An Idiot? (The Weakest Link)
The Office
Grumpy Old Bores/Grumpy Old Bags (Grumpy Old Men)
Smarmnite (Newsnight Review)
I'm Better Than You (The Apprentice)
Earlier with Jools Holland (a breakfast television version of Later With Jools Holland where all the musicians are still asleep)
Miserabel (various Nordic noir series)
Panel Show – a parody of panel game shows including Have I Got News For You, Never Mind The Buzzcocks, Mock The Week and QI
The War to End All Wars (BBC World War I centenary season)

An Evening with Harry Enfield and Paul Whitehouse 
This one-hour special was broadcast in August 2015. Harry and Paul took questions from an audience of celebrities (played mostly by Harry and Paul themselves) and showed clips from Harry Enfield and Chums, Harry Enfield's Television Programme, The Fast Show and Harry & Paul.

Celebrities played by Harry and Paul included Rob Brydon, Harry Hill, Ricky Gervais, Stephen Fry, Melvyn Bragg, Mark Rylance and Stephen Hawking. Enfield also revived his fictional character Dave Nice.

The Love Box in Your Living Room
This was a 1-hour special in October 2022 parodying the documentary style of Adam Curtis to celebrate the 100th anniversary of the BBC.

Characters (main series only)

Series 1

Series 2

Series 3

Series 4

Filipina maid controversy
Philippines foreign secretary Alberto Romulo complained to the British Embassy about a "Clive the Geordie" sketch in the fourth episode of the second series, in which the character is urged by his "owner" to mate (unsuccessfully) with a neighbour's Filipina maid. An online petition started by the "Philippine Foundation" condemned the sketch as "completely disgraceful, distasteful and a great example of gutter humour... inciting stereotyped racial discrimination, vulgarity and violation of the maid's human rights".

The Embassy issued a statement stressing the BBC's editorial independence of the British government, while a spokesman for Tiger Aspect stated that: "Harry & Paul is a post-watershed comedy sketch series and as such tackles many situations in a comedic way. Set in this context, the sketch is so far beyond the realms of reality as to be absurd – and in no way is intended to demean or upset any viewer."

In a 10 October 2008 letter, BBC Director General Mark Thompson formally apologised to Philippine Ambassador to the Court of St James's Edgardo Espiritu: "Please accept my sincere apologies, on behalf of the BBC, for the offence that this programme caused you." Earlier, Chief executive of Harry and Paul producer, Tiger Aspect Productions, Andrew Zane, stated: "We're sorry to anyone who was in any way offended by the programme. This certainly was not our intention." British ambassador to Manila, Peter Beckingham, made a rejoinder: "Our relationship has never been stronger, and the prospects are excellent." The portrayal of Clive the Geordie however remained unchallenged by the BBC. Pyjama clad Clive briefly returned home to Gateshead to work as Paul Gascoigne’s food taster before heading back south after ‘levelling up’ promises failed to materialise. He is currently believed to be living in temporary accommodation at Battersea Dogs Home.

DVD release
Series 1 was released on DVD by 2entertain on 26 November 2007. No extras were included and music edits are noted on the packaging. 
Series 2 was released on DVD on 27 October 2008.
Series 3 was released on DVD on 8 November 2010.
Series 4 was released on DVD on 10 December 2012.
All the DVDs offer English subtitles.

International broadcasters

References

External links
 

2007 British television series debuts
2012 British television series endings
2000s British television sketch shows
2010s British television sketch shows
BAFTA winners (television series)
BBC television sketch shows
English-language television shows
Harry Enfield
Television series by Banijay
Television series by Tiger Aspect Productions